is a former Japanese football player.

Playing career
Miyakawa was born in Atsugi on October 6, 1979. After graduating from high school, he joined J1 League club Cerezo Osaka in 1998. On May 22, 1999, he debuted and scored a goal against JEF United Ichihara. However he could only play this match for the club until 2001. In 2002, he moved to Prefectural Leagues club Thespa Kusatsu and played many matches. The club was promoted to Regional Leagues in 2003, Japan Football League (JFL) in 2004 and J2 League in 2005. In 2006, he moved to Regional Leagues club New Wave Kitakyushu (later Giravanz Kitakyushu). He played as regular player and the club was promoted to JFL in 2008 and J2 in 2010. However his opportunity to play decreased from 2010. In 2012, he moved to Regional Leagues club SC Sagamihara. He retired end of 2012 season.

Club statistics

References

External links

1979 births
Living people
Association football people from Kanagawa Prefecture
Japanese footballers
J1 League players
J2 League players
Japan Football League players
Cerezo Osaka players
Thespakusatsu Gunma players
Giravanz Kitakyushu players
SC Sagamihara players
Association football forwards